Mary Kathleen "Kit" Kinports is an American legal scholar who is Professor of Law and the Polisher Family Distinguished Faculty Scholar at Penn State University. She has taught there since 2006 and specializes in feminism, criminal law and constitutional law.

Biography
Kinports studied at Brown University, where she received an A.B. in 1976. She attended the University of Pennsylvania School of Law, serving as editor-in-chief of the University of Pennsylvania Law Review, and graduating with a J.D. in 1980. After law school, she clerked for Judge Abner Mikva of the United States Court of Appeals for the District of Columbia Circuit, and then for Justice Harry Blackmun of the United States Supreme Court, from 1981 to 1982. Following her clerkships, she practiced law in Washington, D.C. as an associate of Ennis, Friedman, Bersoff & Ewing.

In 2006, she joined the faculty of Penn State, having previously taught at the University of Illinois College of Law. In 2005, she explained the Battered Woman's defense in criminal law. In 2010, she commented on the nomination of Elena Kagan to the U.S. Supreme Court. In October 2018, she signed a letter opposing the confirmation of Brett Kavanaugh to the U.S. Supreme Court.

She is co-author of a popular case book, Criminal Law: Cases and Materials, now in its fourth edition.

Personal life
Kinports was previously married to Stephen F. Ross, an antitrust scholar who is also a law professor at Dickinson College of Law.

See also
 List of law clerks of the Supreme Court of the United States (Seat 2)

References

Select publications

Books

Articles

External links
 Bio, Penn State College of Law
 Author page, SSRN.com

Year of birth missing (living people)
1950s births
Living people
20th-century American lawyers
21st-century American lawyers
Brown University alumni
University of Pennsylvania Law School alumni
Law clerks of the Supreme Court of the United States
Dickinson School of Law faculty
University of Illinois faculty
American legal scholars
American women academics
American scholars of constitutional law
American feminist writers
21st-century American women